Joseph Éric Lucien Landry (born January 20, 1975) is a French-Canadian former professional ice hockey player. Landry played in four National Hockey League (NHL) seasons, playing with the Calgary Flames and the Montreal Canadiens. Landry also played in the Kontinental Hockey League for HC Dynamo Moscow and Atlant Mytishchi and previously in the Swiss National League A (NLA) for Lausanne HC, EHC Basel, and HC Ambrì-Piotta. In 2017, he became head coach of the Gatineau Olympiques in the Quebec Major Junior Hockey League.

Playing career
Born in Gatineau, Landry played midget hockey for Abitibi-Temiscamingue Forestiers, then played two seasons of junior hockey for Saint-Hyacinthe Laser of the Quebec Major Junior Hockey League. Although he was not drafted in the NHL Entry Draft, Landry pursued a professional career in hockey. For the 1995–96 season, he joined the Cape Breton Oilers of the American Hockey League (AHL) to start his career. Landry moved on to the Hamilton Bulldogs for 1996–97. He was then signed as a free agent by the Calgary Flames. He played two seasons for the Flames' organization, split between the Saint John Flames and Calgary. He was traded to the San Jose Sharks in July 1999. Landry played one season in the Sharks organization, for their Kentucky Thoroughblades affiliate. In 2000, he was signed by the Montreal Canadiens and played in the organization for three years, split between Montreal and Quebec Citadelles and the Utah Grizzlies of the AHL. In 2003, Landry left North America to play with Lausanne of the Swiss league. He left North America having played parts of four seasons in the NHL, scoring 5 goals and 9 assists for 14 points in 68 games. Landry was the first player in Canadiens' history to wear the jersey number of 78.

After playing four seasons in the NLA in Switzerland for Lausanne and Basel, Landry moved to Russia, where he played two seasons with Moscow Dynamo and a season with Atlant Mytishchi. Landry returned to the NLA in 2010, to play for HC Ambrì-Piotta.

References

External links

1975 births
Atlant Moscow Oblast players
Calgary Flames players
Canadian ice hockey centres
Cape Breton Oilers players
EHC Basel players
French Quebecers
Gatineau Olympiques coaches
Hamilton Bulldogs (AHL) players
HC Ambrì-Piotta players
HC Dynamo Moscow players
Ice hockey people from Gatineau
Kentucky Thoroughblades players
Lausanne HC players
Living people
Montreal Canadiens players
Montreal Roadrunners players
Ottawa Loggers players
Quebec Citadelles players
Saint-Hyacinthe Laser players
Saint John Flames players
SC Bern players
Undrafted National Hockey League players
Utah Grizzlies (AHL) players
Canadian expatriate ice hockey players in Russia
Canadian expatriate ice hockey players in Switzerland
Canadian ice hockey coaches